The 2007 Thai Premier League had 16 teams, combining the 12 member clubs from the 2006 season, the top two clubs from Division 1, and two clubs from the Pro League 1. The official name of the league at this time was Thailand Premier League.

Matches were normally played on Saturdays with a 4pm kick off time but there were some 5pm or 6pm started and some midweek fixtures. Evening kick offs were rare. The season would have a three-month break from mid-May to mid-August because of the Asian Cup which was being co-hosted by Thailand from July 7–29 and the world university games, the Universiade, in Bangkok from August 8–18.

Normally only the Premier League champions are allowed to take part in the AFC Champions League. However, for the 2007 season, the runners-up would also be admitted due to the late completion of Indonesian domestic league and cup competitions.

Member clubs
Bangkok Bank
Bangkok University
BEC Tero Sasana
Chonburi
Krung Thai Bank
Nakhon Pathom (promoted from Provincial League)
Osotsapa M-150
Port Authority of Thailand
Provincial Electricity Authority
Royal Thai Army
Royal Thai Navy (promoted from Division 1)
Royal Thai Police (promoted from Division 1)
Suphanburi
Thai Honda
Thailand Tobacco Monopoly
TOT (promoted from Provincial League)

Stadium and locations

Final league table

Season notes
 The following clubs were promoted from the Division 1 League and joined the Premier League for 2008:
Chula-Sinthana
Coke-Bangpra
Customs Department
Samut Songkhram
 Thai Premier League was combined with Provincial League completely. Chonburi FC was the first club from Provincial League that was the champion of Thai Premier League in this season.

Asian representation
League champions Bangkok University took centre stage for Thailand in their first foray into the Asian Champions League, they put up a good fight, losing 3 games and drawing 3 games in an impressive campaign, although they still finished bottom of their group stage. Only one team would be for the Asian Champions League due to the fact that Australia entered the Asian Confederation.
Osotsapa  would enter the 2007 AFC Cup, the first time a Thai team would enter this competition. They came third in their group, and only 3 points behind the group winners.
 After reaching the final the previous year, Chonburi made a swift exit from the Singapore Cup getting beat in the first round by Balestier Khalsa. Bangkok University brought back some pride when they duly dispatched of Balestier Khalsa in the Quarter-Final stage before being knocked out by Tampines Rovers in the semi-final.

Results

Annual awards

Coach of the Year
 Jadet Meelarp - Chonburi

Player of the year
 Pipob On-Mo - Chonburi

Top scorer
 Ney Fabiano de Oliveira - 18 Goals Thailand Tobacco Monopoly

See also
 2007 Thailand League Division 1
 2007 Thailand League Division 2

References

Official TPL 2007
Thailand 2007 RSSSF

External links
Official website

1
Thai League 1 seasons
Thai
Thai